Cladonia mitis is a species of fruticose lichen in the family Cladoniaceae. It was formally described as a new species in 1918 by German lichenologist Heinrich Sandstede. It has previously been classified in genus Cladina before molecular phylogenetic studies showed this to be a part of Cladonia. Cladonia mitis is morphologically quite similar to Cladonia arbuscula, and some authors have considered it to be a variety or subspecies of the latter. They differ mainly in the production of secondary compounds: Cladonia mitis produces chemicals in the rangiformic acid complex, which C. arbuscula does not.

See also
List of Cladonia species

References

mitis
Lichen species
Lichens described in 1918
Lichens of Europe
Lichens of North America